Angela Ellsworth is a multidisciplinary American artist traversing disciplines of drawing, sculpture, installation, video, and performance. Her solo and collaborative works have addressed wide-ranging subjects such as physical fitness, endurance, illness, social ritual, and religious tradition. She is interested in art merging with everyday life and public and private experiences colliding in unexpected places. She is a descendant of LDS prophet Lorenzo Snow and was raised as a Mormon; some of her work relates to her religious upbringing. She is openly queer and married to writer/ performer Tania Katan.

Ellsworth is a professor in the School of Art at ASU Herberger Institute for Design and the Arts at Arizona State University. She studied at Hampshire College, in Amherst, Massachusetts, where she received a bachelor's degree in fine art, and graduated from the Mason Gross School of the Arts of Rutgers University in New Brunswick, New Jersey, with a Master of Fine Arts degree in performance and painting. She attended Skowhegan School of Painting and Sculpture on a fellowship.

Ellsworth has exhibited at the Museum of Contemporary Art in Sydney, Australia, and at the Arizona State University Art Museum in Tempe, Arizona. She is one of the founders of the Museum of Walking (MoW) which is the only museum of its kind in the United States.  Her work can be found in Art News, Fiber Arts, Landscape Architecture Magazine, Canadian Art, Frieze Art, Artforum.com, and Performance Research.

She has presented work nationally and internationally including the Getty Center (Los Angeles), Museum of Contemporary Art (Sydney), Australia), Zacheta National Gallery of Art (Warsaw, Poland), National Review of Live Art (Glasgow, Scotland), Los Angeles Contemporary Exhibitions (Los Angeles, California), Crystal Bridges (Bentonville, Arkansas), Arizona State University Art Museum (Tempe, Arizona), Museum of Contemporary Art (Denver), Colorado), Scottsdale Museum of Contemporary Art (Scottsdale, Arizona), and Phoenix Art Museum (Phoenix, Arizona.)

Awards and grants include Art Matters, Franklin Furnace, New Jersey State Council on the Arts, The Pennsylvania Council for the Arts, New Forms Regional Initiative Grant, from Mexic-Arte Museum, and DiverseWorks, funded by The Andy Warhol Foundation and The Rockefeller Foundation. She is represented by Lisa Sette Gallery in Phoenix Arizona and Modern West Contemporary, Salt Lake City.

Selected solo exhibitions and performance (2018–2008)

References

American women artists
Living people
Year of birth missing (living people)
Artists from California
LGBT Latter Day Saints
Queer artists
21st-century American LGBT people
21st-century American women
Skowhegan School of Painting and Sculpture alumni
Arizona State University faculty
Hampshire College alumni
American lesbian artists